Živinice Grad is a village in the municipality of Živinice, Bosnia and Herzegovina. It is the main town of the municipality.

Demographics 
According to the 2013 census, its population was 16,157.

References

Populated places in Živinice